The 1969 World Table Tennis Championships men's doubles was the 30th edition of the men's doubles championship.
Hans Alsér and Kjell Johansson won the title after defeating Nobuhiko Hasegawa and Tokio Tasaka in the final by three sets to one.

Results

See also
List of World Table Tennis Championships medalists

References

-